The Maltrata bus crash was a road accident on 17 April 2006 near the Mexican town of Maltrata, around 125 kilometers from Mexico City. At least 57 people were killed, including 10 children.

Overview 

Mexican pilgrims were being transported from Guadalajara to Mexico City after they had attended a religious festival in the Northern city. Their 22-year-old bus had already been travelling for ten hours when police say it apparently developed a fault, probably with its brakes. The bus was descending a highway on a steep hill at over 70 miles per hour. The driver attempted to manoeuvre into an emergency hard shoulder but lost control, sending the bus rolling down a ravine which bordered the road.  

The bus fell approximately 650 feet into the stream bed below, crashing into the hillside several times as it descended. The bus was well over its capacity of 46, carrying at least 60 passengers. 57 of those were killed in the impact, and the three survivors were all very seriously injured. Initial reports said that there had been 71 passengers on the bus and 63 had died, but these numbers were scaled back as bodies were identified and several critically injured people died in the rescue operation.

The police believe that the bus's brakes were faulty, having not been serviced properly in many years, and that the driver was driving much too fast for the dangerous road, which is a well known accident black spot, owing to the lack of crash barriers. The owner of the company which supplied the bus was taken in for questioning by Mexican police.

See also 

 List of road accidents

External links 
BBC News Report
USA Today News Report

Bus incidents in Mexico
2006 road incidents
2006 in Mexico
April 2006 events in North America